Eight ships have been named Stena Baltica:
Stena Baltica (1966) scrapped 2006
Stena Baltica (1966) scrapped 2003
Stena Baltica (1971) scrapped 2004
Stena Baltica (1973) now  with Montenegro Lines
Stena Baltica (1973) now  with Ventouris Ferries
Stena Baltica (1986) now  with SNAV
, named in 2013, built as Cotentin for Brittany Ferries, and returned to its original name in 2020
, named in 2021, built as Mersey Viking for Norse Merchant Ferries

Ship names